The CZ 527 is a bolt-action smallbore rifle designed by Česká zbrojovka Uherský Brod. CZ discontinued production in 2021. There are numerous different designs and stylings. The available calibers (though not every rifle is designed for each of the calibers) are the following: .17 Remington, .17 Hornet, .22 Hornet, .204 Ruger, .221 Fireball, .222 Remington, .223 Remington, 6.5mm Grendel, .300 AAC Blackout and 7.62×39mm.

The CZ527 is a continuation of the model and styling of the BRNO Fox which was a popular short action mini-Mauser manufactured and sold to the international market by BRNO Czechoslovakia from the 1960's up until the Czech firearms manufacturers were privatised in the 1990's. CZ Česká Zbrojovka inherited the design from the previous national enterprise and continued making the rifle, marketing it as the CZ527. 

The CZ 527 Lux, CZ 527 FS and CZ 527 Carbine are traditional European style models featuring open sights and a Turkish walnut stock in the Bavarian pattern while CZ 527 American, CZ 527 Varmint and CZ 527 Prestige are models made specifically for the US market with the American customer in mind featuring a classic American pattern stock with 18 LPI checkering.

The CZ 527 Varmint is an American-style bolt-action smallbore rifle designed by Česká zbrojovka Uherský Brod based on the CZ 527. It has a Mauser-style action, and is available in three different stylings: Standard, Laminated and Aramid composite.

The standard Varmint model is available in three calibers: .17 Remington, .204 Ruger and .223 Remington. It comes with different types of wood stocks depending on the caliber such as American walnut and curly maple. The Laminated Varmint features a Grey Laminated stock and is only available in .223 Remington, it weighs .

The last styling of the Varmint model is known as the Kevlar model. The primary difference is the stock is made of a Kevlar composite manufactured by H-S Precision. The rifle has an aluminium bedding block to which the action is screwed while the barrel is free floated.

References

External links
Manufacturer's webpage about CZ 527
CZ 527 models

.300 BLK firearms
5.56 mm firearms
7.62×39mm bolt-action rifles
Rifles of Czechoslovakia